Events in the year 1908 in Japan. It corresponds to Meiji 41 (明治41年) in the Japanese calendar.

Incumbents
Emperor: Emperor Meiji
Prime Minister:
Saionji Kinmochi (until July 14)
Katsura Tarō (from July 14)

Governors
Aichi Prefecture: Masaaki Nomura
Akita Prefecture: Chuji Shimooka, Mori Masataka
Aomori Prefecture: Shotaro Nishizawa, Takeda Chiyosaburo
Ehime Prefecture: Kensuke Ando
Fukui Prefecture: Nakamura Junkuro
Fukushima Prefecture: Hiraoka Teitaro then Shotaro Nishizawa
Gifu Prefecture: Sadakichi Usu
Gunma Prefecture: Arita Yoshisuke then Nanbu Mitsumi then Uruji Kamiyama
Hiroshima Prefecture: Tadashi Munakata
Ibaraki Prefecture: Mori Masataka, Keisuke Sakanaka
Iwate Prefecture: Shinichi Kasai
Kagawa Prefecture: Motohiro Onoda
Kochi Prefecture: Sada Suzuki, Kenzo Ishihara
Kumamoto Prefecture: Nori Oshikawa, Kawaji Toshikyo
Kyoto Prefecture: Baron Shoichi Omori
Mie Prefecture: Lord Arimitsu Hideyoshi, Hayashi Ichizo, Yoshisuke Arita
Miyagi Prefecture: Kamei Ezaburo, Hiroyuki Terada
Miyazaki Prefecture: Nagai Enjin, Tadayoshi Naokichi
Nagano Prefecture: Akira Oyama
Niigata Prefecture: Prince Kiyoshi Honba
Okinawa Prefecture: Shigeru Narahara, Shigeaki Hibi
Saga Prefecture: Fai Kagawa, Inoue Takashihara, Nishimura Mutsu
Saitama Prefecture: Shimada Gotaro
Shiname Prefecture: Matsunaga Takeyoshi, Raizo Wakabayashi, Maruyama Shigetoshi
Tochigi Prefecture: .....
Tokyo: Baron Sangay Takatomi, Hiroshi Abe
Toyama Prefecture: Shinhare Kawakami, Usami Katsuo
Yamagata Prefecture: Mabuchi Eitaro

Events
April 30 – Masako, Princess Tsune, sixth daughter of Emperor Meiji, marries Prince Tsunehisa Takeda.
May 15 – 1908 Japanese general election
June 22 – Red Flag Incident
November 30 – Root–Takahira Agreement
Unknown date – Yasui Sewing Machine, as predecessor of Brother Industries founded in Nagoya.

Births
February 27 – Kazuo Hasegawa, actor (d. 1984)
February 29 – Masahiro Makino, film director (d. 1993)
April 11 – Masaru Ibuka, electronics industrialist, co-founder of Sony (d. 1997)
July 8 – Kaii Higashiyama, painter (d. 2009)
July 9 – Takashi Asahina,  conductor (d. 2001)
September 14 – Nobuo Nakamura, actor (d. 1991)
October 17 – Kenji Miyamoto, communist politician (d. 2007)
November 10 – Kenkichi Oshima, triple jumper (d. 1985)
November 11 – Sadako Sawamura, actress (d. 1996)
December 27 – Tadao Tannaka, triple jumper (d. 1986)

Deaths
January 13 – Hashimoto Gahō, painter (b. 1835)
March 25 – Iwasaki Yanosuke, businessman, and 4th Governor of the Bank of Japan (b. 1851)
May 2 – Prince Yamashina Kikumaro, (b. 1873)
June 23 – Doppo Kunikida, author and poet (b. 1871)
October 18 – Nozu Michitsura, field marshal (b. 1840)
October 26 – Enomoto Takeaki, politician, President of the Republic of Ezo (b. 1836)
November 25 – Inagaki Manjirō, diplomat (b. 1861)
December 17 – Inoue Hikaru general (b. 1851)

References

 
1900s in Japan